CKHQ-FM (Kanehsatake United Voices Radio) is a First Nations community radio station that operates at 101.7 FM in Kanesatake, Quebec, Canada.

Previously owned by the Kanehsatake Communications Society and serving the Mohawk community, the station received CRTC approval in 1988. Following the death of a former station manager in the early-2000s, the station went dark and was abandoned. The station's license lapsed in 2004, after a one-year renewal period, but was never renewed.

Sometime in 2013, the station resumed broadcasting, but as a pirate radio station on a part-time basis, without a current license. On December 9, 2013, the reserve, through licensee James Nelson "on behalf of a corporation to be incorporated", applied for a new license, which will broadcast at 101.7 MHz with an average effective radiated power (ERP) of 11 watts (maximum ERP of 27 watts with an effective height of antenna above average terrain of 27.2 metres). In addition, the license stipulates that the station would provide 83 hours of programming a week—roughly 12 hours a day, with 68 hours featuring music programs and 15 hours spoken word. Languages that would be featured are 95% English and 5% Mohawk; the new language provision differs from the original 1988 license, which stipulated that 55% of programs must be in Mohawk, 40% in English and 5% in French. The application was approved by the CRTC on June 17, 2014.

Funding for the new incarnation of CKHQ-FM will be provided through donations and fundraising events, as well as through its bingo radio program.

On May 11, 2021, Mohawk Multi Media received approval by the CRTC to acquire the assets of the low-power English- and Mohawk-language Indigenous radio station CKHQ-FM Kanesatake/Oka and to obtain a new broadcasting licence to continue the operation of the station.  On June 14, 2021, Mohawk Multi Media received CRTC approval to operate an English- and Kanien’ké:ha (Mohawk) language Indigenous (Type B Native) radio station in Kanesatake/Oka, Quebec at 101.7 MHz (channel 269A1) with an effective radiated power (ERP) of 51 watts (omni-directional antenna with an effective height of the antenna above average terrain of 55.9 metres).

References

External links
ckhq.caster.fm - CKHQ United Voices
Facebook: CKHQ
 

Khq
Khq
Pirate radio stations in Canada
Former pirate radio stations
Mohawk culture
Radio stations established in 1988
1988 establishments in Quebec